Bloxsome is a British surname, possessed by a surviving line of Bloxsome's in Australia who originally immigrated from Europe in the late 19th century to early 20th century.

See also
 Blosxom, a type of software.

References
"Bloxsom". Surname db